Marylands School was a residential school for children with learning difficulties in Christchurch, New Zealand. It was opened in 1955 and run by the Roman Catholic order Brothers Hospitallers of St. John of God.

The school was in Middleton but moved into premises in Halswell vacated in the late 1960s by the Sisters of the Good Shepherd. It changed name in 1984 to Hogben School when it was taken over by the Ministry of Education as a State special school.  The land and school buildings had been owned by the Government since the 1970s when money was given for it to be rebuilt after a fire.

Sexual abuse
Staff at the school were involved in 121 sex abuse allegations dating back from the 1970s, with about eighty former students receiving a total payout for compensation of about $5 million.

By 2006, the Australasian branch of the St John of God order had paid out $5.1 million to survivors who had been sexually abused at the school. A nonprofit trust, the Survivors of Sex Abuse Trust, worked with many of the victims. Over 120 complaints were made in regard to sexual and physical abuse alleged to have occurred at the school. Many of the offences were committed in the 1970s.

The head of the Brothers of St John of God, Brother Timothy Graham, said,

Bernard McGrath 

Brother Bernard Kevin McGrath received 21 guilty verdicts and pleaded guilty to one charge of sexually abusing boys in 2006. In 2009 TV One screened an episode of Real Crime: Beyond the Darklands in which clinical psychologist Nigel Latta talked to McGrath's victims and evaluated his motivations and likelihood to re-offend. In November 2012, 252 new charges were laid in New South Wales against McGrath alleging that he repeatedly raped, molested and abused dozens of young boys at church-run institutions in the Newcastle-Maitland diocese over several decades. McGrath, then aged 65 years, flew back to Christchurch from Sri Lanka on 29 November 2012 and was arrested on Friday 30 November to face proceedings to extradite him to Australia on the new charges. In late 2014 he was extradited to Australia and appeared in court on the charges contained in an 8000-page brief. One accuser, Donald Daniel Ku, would testify before the Commission in February 2022, claiming that McGrath sexually abused him in 1963 while he was a student at Marylands School and also put him in a coffin containing a dead body. in February 2022, one accuser, Donald Daniel Ku, testified before New Zealand's Royal Commission of Inqury into Abuse, claiming that McGrath sexually abused him in 1963 while he was a student Marylands School and also put him in a coffin containing a dead body. Other accusers who were students at Marylands testified as well, claiming that McGrath would sexually abuse them, make them look at dead bodies after shoving them into coffins and also physical them with objects such as crucifixes.

Brother Roger Maloney 

In 2008 Brother Roger Maloney, who also worked at Marylands School, was found guilty of seven sex abuse charges and was acquitted of a further 16. After being extradited from Australia, he was jailed for three years for committing sex offences. He unsuccessfully appealed against the length of the sentence. After serving 13 months of a 33-month sentence he was accepted back into the Australian branch of the Order of St John of God.

Brother Raymond Garchow 

Father Raymond John Garchow (1940s?–3 March 2011) was given a stay of proceedings relating to eight charges over the sexual abuse of boys because he was too ill to stand trial.

Brother William Lebler 
Brother William Lebler was one of three Brothers from St John of God charged with child sex crimes in 2005. Australian Magistrate Hugh Dillon ordered Lebler, Garchow and Maloney to be extradited to New Zealand. Psychologists deemed Lebler "borderline retarded" and therefore was deemed unfit to stand trial. In 2013, Lebler was filmed by the Sydney Morning Herald attended an Alcoholics Anonymous meeting in Sydney CBD.

St John of God has paid compensation to many of Lebler's victims, often demanding the victim signs a Non Disclosure Agreement to ensure their silence

See also
Christianity in New Zealand
Catholic Church sexual abuse cases by country

References

Schools in Christchurch
Special schools in New Zealand
Educational institutions established in 1955
1955 establishments in New Zealand